In geometry, the heptagrammic cupola is a star-cupola made from a heptagram, {7/3} and parallel tetradecagram, {14/3}, connected by 7 mutually intersecting equilateral triangles and squares.

Related polyhedra

Crossed heptagrammic cupola

The crossed heptagrammic cupola is a star-cupola made from a heptagram, {7/5} and parallel tetradecagram, {14/5}, connected by 7 mutually intersecting equilateral triangles and squares.

References 
 Jim McNeill, Cupola OR Semicupola

External links 
 VRML models 7-3 7-5

Prismatoid polyhedra